Bzr may refer to:

 GNU Bazaar
 Benzodiazepine receptor (also known as the GABAA receptor)
 Béziers Cap d'Agde Airport
 Toyota Levin/Trueno BZ-R